TTMM – Tujha Tu Majha Mi is an Indian Marathi language film directed by Kuldip Jadhav. The film stars Lalit Prabhakar, Neha Mahajan, Vidyadhar Joshi and Savita Prabhune. Music by Pankaj Padghan. The film was released on 16 June 2017.

Synopsis 
Jay, an enthusiastic traveller, leaves his house to explore different parts of the country. On his way to Goa, he befriends Rajashree, a young woman who has also fled her home.

Cast 
 Lalit Prabhakar
 Neha Mahajan
 Vidyadhar Joshi
 Savita Prabhune
 Satish Pulekar
 Seema Deshmukh
 Sagar Karande
 Pushkar Lonarkar
 Sharvari Lohakare
 Pushkaraj Chirputkar
 Bharat Ganeshpure
 Kadambari Kadam in Special Appearance

Soundtrack

Critical reception 
TTMM – Tujha Tu Majha Mi film received positive reviews from critics. Blessy Chettiar  of Cinestaan.com gave the film 3 stars out of 5 and wrote "TTMM effectively echoes the story of many homes today, where parents and children lock horns over the topic of marriage". Madhura Nerurkar of Loksatta gave the film 2.5 stars out of 5 and wrote "Some of the songs in the movie are good. The feature of this movie is that there is no exaggeration anywhere in the movie. The movie moves forward in a rhythm and ends like that". Ganesh Matkari of Pune Mirror wrote "Despite this, the film is a reasonably feel good experience with decent performances all around. A shorter, and betterpaced script would have resulted in a better product to be sure". Ibrahim Afgan of Maharashtra Times gave the film 3.5 stars out of 5 and wrote "Just because the story revolves around a few major characters doesn't ignore these other threads. It is also taken care of here. So its other oddities, mistakes and faults are to be ignored". Mihir Bhanage of The Times of India gave the film 3 stars out of 5 and wrote "A special mention to cinematographer, Mayur Hardas, who has captured the essence of story through his frames. Overall, TTMM is a fairly good watch".

References

External links
 

2017 films
2010s Marathi-language films
Indian drama films